In game theory, an intransitive or non-transitive game is the one in which the various strategies produce one or more "loops" of preferences.  In a non-transitive game in which strategy A is preferred over strategy B, and strategy B is preferred over strategy C, strategy A is not necessarily preferred over strategy C.

A prototypical example non-transitive game is the game rock, paper, scissors which is explicitly constructed as a non-transitive game.  In probabilistic games like Penney's game, the violation of transitivity results in a more subtle way, and is often presented as a probability paradox.

Examples
 Rock, paper, scissors
 Penney's game
 Intransitive dice
 Street Fighter. The videogame franchise that introduced the common convention that block beats strike, strike beats throw, and throw beats block.
 Halo Wars 2. A videogame noted for having a cycle in which aircraft beat landcraft, landcraft beat infantry, and infantry beat aircraft.

See also
 Stochastic transitivity

References
 

Game theory game classes